Großenhain (also written as Grossenhain) is a Große Kreisstadt (German for major district town) in the district of Meissen, Saxony, Germany. It was originally known as Hayne. The current name simply means "big Hayne"

History
Großenhain was originally a Sorbian settlement, and remains an area where this language is spoken. 

It was first mentioned in 1205. It was for a time occupied by the Bohemians, by whom it was strongly fortified. It afterwards came into the possession of the margraves of Meissen, from whom it was taken in 1312 by the margraves of Brandenburg. In the middle-ages, Großenhain was one of the most powerful towns in Saxony. 

It suffered considerably in all the great German wars, and in 1744 was nearly destroyed by fire. The fire destroyed the church which was then replaced by the current Marienkirche, which echoes internally echoes the Frauenkirche in nearby Dresden.

On May 16, 1813, a battle took place here between the French (Napoleon's army) and the Russians.

A military airfield was created near the town, opening in February 1914. From 1945 to 1993 the air base of the Soviet Air Force was located at this airfield. On the territory of the base there was also a secret Soviet military unit serving nuclear weapons stored at the base. On May 27, 1973  an aircraft technician senior lieutenant Yevgeny Vronsky hijacked a fighter-bomber Su-7BM # 52  from this base to the Federal Republic of Germany. Before that Vronsky had no experience in piloting aircraft. Nevertheless he safely crossed the border of the Federal Republic of Germany and after that was safely ejected. The plane crashed into a forest near the city of Braunschweig.

Kulturzentrum Grossenhain (the culture centre) was recently created, cleverly converting the ruined fragments of Schloss Grossenhain into a modern building.

On May 24, 2010, Großenhain was hit by a rain-wrapped F3 tornado which killed 1 & injured 40 others. This event made sirens sound for 60 seconds in and around Großenhain. The fatality was a 6 year old girl who was killed by a downed tree.

Geography

It is also situated on Via Regia from Görlitz to Santiago de Compostela.

Divisions
The town Großenhain consists of Großenhain proper and the following Ortschaften or municipal divisions:

Bauda
Colmnitz
Folbern
Görzig
Nasseböhla (incl. Stroga)
Skassa
Skäßchen (incl. Krauschütz, Skaup and Uebigau)
Strauch
Walda-Kleinthiemig
Weßnitz-Rostig
Wildenhain
Zabeltitz (incl. Treugeböhla)

These Ortschaften correspond with former municipalities or their divisions, that were absorbed into Großenhain between 1994 and 2010. The localities Großraschütz, Kleinraschütz, Mülbitz, Naundorf, Zschauitz and Zschieschen are former municipalities that were absorbed into Großenhain between 1913 and 1961.

Infrastructure 
There are two train stations in Großenhain. The Großenhain Berliner Bahnhof had been out of service since 2002, leaving only the Großenhain Cottbusser Bahnhof, served by trains from Dresden to Elsterwerda, Cottbus and Hoyerswerda.

Großenhain is accessible by car via Bundesstraße 98 and Bundesstraße 101.

Famous people

Martin Blochwich (1602-1629): German physician, born here
Lucas Krzikalla (born 1994): German handball player, born here
Karl Benjamin Preusker (1786–1871): Founder of the first public library in Germany (1828)
Manfred von Richthofen (1892–1918): German fighter pilot known as The Red Baron, was trained as observer at the local airport
Corinna Harfouch (born 1954): German actress, passed her childhood here
Benjamin Hedericus (1675-1748): Lexicographer
Heino (born 1938): German schlager artist, passed his childhood here
 Carlo Mierendorff (1897-1943), representatives of the SPD, a member of the German Reichstag and resistance fighter against Nazism
 Frederick Traugott Pursh (1774-1820), actually  Friedrich Pursch , botanist
 Helmut H. Schaefer (1925-2005), mathematician, professor at the University of Halle (Saale), at the University of Tübingen, at the California Institute of Technology and other US universities
 Ingo Senftleben (born 1974), German politician (CDU)
 Valentin Weigel (1533-1588), theologian and philosopher
 Frieder Zschoch (1932–2016), musicologist

References

External links

  

Meissen (district)